TheGuardian.com, formerly known as Guardian.co.uk and Guardian Unlimited, is a British news and media website owned by the Guardian Media Group. It contains nearly all of the content of the newspapers The Guardian and The Observer, as well as a substantial body of web-only work produced by its own staff, including a rolling news service. As of November 2014, it was the second most popular online newspaper in the UK with over 17 million readers per month; with over 21 million monthly readers, Mail Online was the most popular.

The site is made up of a core news site, with niche sections and subsections covering subjects including sport, business, environment, technology, arts and media, and lifestyle. TheGuardian.com is notable for its engagement with readers, including long-running talkboards and, more recently, a network of weblogs. Its seven blogs were joined on 14 March 2006, by a new comment section, "Comment is free", which has since merged into its Opinion section.

The site can be viewed without cost or registration, though some services such as leaving comments on articles require users to register. In March 2009, Guardian.co.uk launched their API, using the OAuth protocol and making a wide range of Guardian content available for use by web application developers.

Ownership
TheGuardian.com is part of the Guardian Media Group of newspapers, radio stations, and new media, including The Guardian daily newspaper and The Observer Sunday newspaper. Guardian Media Group is owned by the Scott Trust, a charitable foundation which aims to ensure the newspaper's editorial independence in perpetuity, maintaining its financial health to ensure it does not become vulnerable to takeover by for-profit media groups, and the serious compromise of editorial independence that this often brings.

History
Guardian.co.uk was launched in 1999, born of the Guardian New Media Lab. Its popularity soared after the September 11 attacks in the United States in 2001, largely thanks to the diverse range of viewpoints published in The Guardian newspaper. The website won the Best Newspaper category in the 2005, 2006 and 2007 Webby Awards, beating the New York Times, the Washington Post, the Wall Street Journal and Variety.

In 2006, Guardian.co.uk reported its first profitable year, with income coming mostly from recruitment and display advertising. In May 2007, guardian.co.uk begun an 18-month programme of redesigning and adding features to the entire website, starting with the travel section, then moving through the rest of the site and the front page, finally updating the blogging and community features. On 30 July 2013, the website was moved from guardian.co.uk to theguardian.com as part of increasing investments to grow globally.

In 2018 TheGuardian.com joined with competitors News UK (The Times, The Sunday Times, The Sun) and The Daily Telegraph to create a joint platform for advertisers to buy online adverts across the multiple leading news websites, called The Ozone Project. Later in the year Reach plc (formerly Trinity Mirror) joined the platform, bringing nearly all of UK's national newspapers onto the platform.

Subsites and related online publications

Guardian Sport
The Guardian's Sport section has made the online transition into a popular and well-respected website, providing news, results, match reports, and live commentaries from a host of different sports.

TheGuardian.com's sports coverage has been pioneering in the online newspaper industry in the United Kingdom in offering live coverage of sports, especially football, over the Web.  Examples include live text commentaries of 115 Premier League football matches and every FIFA World Cup match, as well as some live coverage of the FA Cup, Champions League, Europa League, and the occasional La Liga, League Cup, and playoff games.

"The Fiver"
"The Fiver" is a daily, mostly humorous football newsletter, available in the Sport section or via email newsletter, delivered to opt-in subscribers' inboxes at (approximately) 5 pm Guardian Standard Time, Monday to Friday (hence the name "Fiver"). It does not appear in the print edition of The Guardian newspaper. "The Fiver" enjoys a worldwide following. Fiver writers include Paul Doyle and Barry Glendenning and are drawn from the Guardian sportswriting staff.

"Comment is free"

"Comment is free" (abbreviated Cif) was a comment and political opinion section within TheGuardian.com.  It contained comment and opinion pieces from The Guardian and The Observer newspapers, plus contributions from more than 600 other writers. The section was edited by Natalie Hanman; its sub-site devoted to religious affairs, "Cif belief", was edited by Andrew Brown. It was launched on 14 March 2006, with Georgina Henry as launch editor. The original technical design and build was by Ben Hammersley, based on the Movable Type blogging platform. Latterly, Cif ran on a custom Guardian-made system, using Pluck for the commenting.

The site's name was derived from a sentence in a famous essay written by veteran Guardian editor C. P. Scott: "Comment is free, but facts are sacred."

The site strictly enforced its talk policy by moderating comments after posting. For particularly sensitive topics, comments may be moderated before posting. Moderators could remove posts that violated the site's Community Standards (usually leaving a marker of the removal), but did not edit them.

"Comment is free" has merged with TheGuardian.com's "Opinion" section, starting in late 2014 with the US edition, and concluding in early 2015 with the UK edition. It no longer uses the "Comment is free" title, though commentisfree remains in its URL.

Guardian America

Guardian America was an American version of the British news website Guardian Unlimited. The strategy, intended to win more U.S.-based readers, was abandoned in October 2009.

Much of the content on Guardian America was taken from Guardian Unlimited and The Guardian, although some content was produced specifically for Guardian America.

Guardian US, launched in September 2011, is The Guardian's New York City-based American online presence. GuardianAmerica.com now redirects to The Guardian'''s United States topic page.

 Tor network version 
In May 2022 the Guardian launched an .onion version of its website on the Tor network, with assistance from Alec Muffett.

Readership
TheGuardian.com is one of the UK's leading online newspapers. It became the first UK newspaper to attract more than 25 million unique users in a month (October 2008). On 7 July 2005, following the London bombings, 1.3 million unique users visited the site and a total of 7.8 million pages were viewed, at the time a record for guardian.co.uk.

As of August 2010 it was the second-most popular UK newspaper website after Mail Online, getting almost 34.6 million unique users monthly, and 13.7 million unique British users monthly. By May 2011 it reached 2.8m unique visitors per day, and 51.3m per month, behind the MailOnline's 4.4m and 77.3m. As of May 2013, using National Readership Survey and comScore's statistics, it was the most popular UK newspaper website with 8.2m unique visitors per month, ahead of Mail Online with 7.6m unique monthly visitors. By July 2021, however, Mail Online was reported to have the highest level of online daily readers in the UK at 4.1 million.

Awards
British Press Awards:
 "Digital Innovation of the Year" (2008, 2009)
 "Digital Journalist of the Year" (Sean Smith, 2008; Dave Hill, 2009)
The awards were created in 2008.

Moreover, the 2011 award of "Political Journalist of the Year" to The Guardian'''s Andrew Sparrow "was significant because it was a recognition of the impact of his general election live blog – a reward for innovation as well as reporting."

In 2009 it was nominated for (but did not win) a Webby Award for "Best Copy/Writing". However, the subsite Cif belief was nominated for and won, the Webby in the best religion and spirituality site category.

References

External links
 
 theguardian.com blogs
 Comment is Free

British news websites
Guardian Media Group
Publications established in 1999
The Guardian
The Observer
1999 establishments in the United Kingdom
English-language websites